Karina Bacchi (born October 8, 1976) is a Brazilian actress, model and television presenter, best known for being the winner of the first season of the Brazilian version of Dancing with the Stars (late 2005) and the winner of the second season of the Brazilian version of The Farm (early 2010).

Biography 
Karina was born in São Manuel, São Paulo. She is of Italian, Spanish and African descent.

Career 
She began her modeling career at the age of four. At the age of fourteen, she moved to São Paulo, where she first designed herself as a photographic model and later in parades, advertising campaigns in magazines and television. In addition to advertising and fashion, she studied theater and dance. Karina Bacchi illustrated numerous covers of magazines such as Playboy, Galileo, Boa Forma, Nova, Vip, among others. She also did several pictorials for sites such as the Paparazzo and The Girl.

Personal life 
On August 8, 2017, her first child was born. Enrico Bacchi was born in Miami, Florida, the result of an artificial insemination procedure.

Partial filmography

References

External links

 
 

1976 births
Living people
People from São Manuel
Brazilian people of Italian descent
Brazilian people of Spanish descent
Brazilian television presenters
Brazilian female models
Brazilian telenovela actresses
Actresses from São Paulo (state)
Reality show winners
Dancing with the Stars winners
The Farm (TV series) winners
Brazilian women television presenters
21st-century Brazilian women